The 1992 Texas Longhorns baseball team represented the University of Texas at Austin in the 1992 NCAA Division I baseball season. The Longhorns played their home games at Disch–Falk Field. The team was coached by Cliff Gustafson in his 25th season at Texas.

The Longhorns reached the College World Series, where they recorded a pair of wins against  and a pair of losses to eventual champion Pepperdine.

Personnel

Roster

Coaches

Schedule and results

References

Texas Longhorns baseball seasons
Texas Longhorns
College World Series seasons
Texas Longhorns Baseball
Southwest Conference baseball champion seasons